José Geraldo León Vega (born December 8, 1976) is a Puerto Rican former professional baseball third baseman who played in Major League Baseball for the Baltimore Orioles from –). He has also played professionally in Puerto Rico, Mexico, Taiwan and Venezuela.

León was born in Cayey, Puerto Rico. He was once a highly regarded power-hitting prospect, but he never lived up to his early potential. He was selected for the World team in the 2000 All-Star Futures Game. León made the Mexican League All-Star team in 2006 batting .348 with 17 home runs and 49 RBI. He made the All-Star team again in 2007 batting .300 with 14 home runs and 46 RBI. In 2008, he played in only 28 games batting .279.

In 2018, León returned to the Cardinals organization as the hitting coach for the Dominican Summer League Cardinals, a rookie league affiliate based in the Dominican Republic. León was the 2019 manager of the State College Spikes, the Class A Short Season affiliate of the St. Louis Cardinals in the New York–Penn League. He was to return to that position for the 2020 season. In 2021, León was promoted to manager of the Palm Beach Cardinals, the Cardinals' Low-A affiliate.

References

External links
, or Retrosheet

1976 births
Living people
Arkansas Travelers players
Atenienses de Manatí (baseball) players
Baltimore Orioles players
Bowie Baysox players
Camden Riversharks players
Guerreros de Oaxaca players
Indianapolis Indians players
Johnson City Cardinals players
Leones de Ponce players
Liga de Béisbol Profesional Roberto Clemente infielders
Lobos de Arecibo players
Long Island Ducks players
Louisville Bats players
Major League Baseball first basemen
Major League Baseball players from Puerto Rico
Major League Baseball third basemen
Mexican League baseball first basemen
Mexican League baseball third basemen
Navegantes del Magallanes players
Puerto Rican expatriate baseball players in Venezuela
New Jersey Cardinals players
Olmecas de Tabasco players
Ottawa Lynx players
People from Cayey, Puerto Rico
Peoria Chiefs players
Pericos de Puebla players
Piratas de Campeche players
Prince William Cannons players
Puerto Rican expatriate baseball players in Canada
Puerto Rican expatriate baseball players in Mexico
Rochester Red Wings players
Savannah Cardinals players
Tigres de Quintana Roo players
Puerto Rican expatriate baseball players in Taiwan
Dmedia T-REX players
Minor league baseball managers
Macoto Cobras players